Junaid Halim is a Bangladeshi film actor and editor. He is also one of the renowned professors of film studies in Bangladesh. He teaches films at Jagannath University, one of the reputed public universities in Bangladesh. He won Bangladesh National Film Award for Best Editing three times for the films Shankhonad (2004), Britter Baire (2009) and Maya: The Lost Mother (2019).

Early life

Junaid Halim was born in Madhabdi municipality area in Narsingdi District under Dhaka division. His parents are late A. J. M Abdul Halim Mollah and late Rijia Halim.

Education

Professor Junaid Halim obtained his honors and masters degrees from the Department of Mass Communication and Journalism at the University of Dhaka (1983-87). He later have flown to India to pursue his higher education at the Film and Television Institute, Pune and completed his Diploma in Cinema (Specialization in Editing) in (1995-1996). He returned to Dhaka later and joined as a lecturer of the Department of Mass Communication and Journalism at Jagannath University.

Filmography

As an actor 
 Shey – 1993
 Dub Satar – 2011

As an editor

Awards and nominations
National Film Awards

References

   3. '''Prof Junaid Halim wins National Film Award again
   4. কষ্ট করেছেন তারেক মাসুদ, সংগ্রাম করেই চলছে ক্যাথরিনের জীবন : জুনায়েদ হালিম
   5. জবির ফিল্ম অ্যান্ড টেলিভিশন বিভাগের দায়িত্বে ফের জুনায়েদ হালিম
   6. তিনবার চলচ্চিত্র পুরস্কার জিতলেন অধ্যাপক জুনায়েদ হালিম
   7. জবির ফিল্ম এন্ড টেলিভিশন বিভাগের দ্বায়িত্বে ফের জুনায়েদ হালিম
   8. JnU student ‘forced’ out of exam hall
   9. JnU Film Society to host three-day film festival
   10. ‘Take your camera, frame your dream’

External links

Living people
Bangladeshi film editors
Best Editor National Film Award (Bangladesh) winners
Year of birth missing (living people)